This is a list of members of the Sicilian Mafia born in Sicily.

A
 Mariano Agate (1939–2013)
 Pietro Aglieri (1928–2000)
 Gerlando Alberti (1927–2012)
 Giovanni Arena (1923–2004)

B
 Gaetano Badalamenti (1923-2004)
 Leoluca Bagarella
 Calogero Bagarella (1935-1969)
 Giovanni Bonomo (1935–2010)
 Francesco Paolo Bontade (1914–1974)
Giovanni Bontade (1946–1988)
 Stefano Bontade (1939–1981)
 Bernardo Brusca
 Giovanni Brusca
 Tommaso Buscetta (1928–2000)
 Joseph Bonanno (1905–2002)

C
Antonino Calderone (1935–2013)
Giuseppe Calderone (1925–1978)
Frank Cali (1965-2019)
Giuseppe Calò
Salvatore Cancemi (1942–2011)
Benedetto Capizzi
Alfonso Caruana
Michele Cavataio (1929–1969)
Salvatore Contorno
Antonio Cottone (1904/05–1956)
Salvatore Cuffaro

D
 Salvatore D'Aquila (1873–1928)
Francesco Di Carlo
Giuseppe Di Cristina (1923–1978)
Maurizio Di Gati
Baldassare Di Maggio
Santino Di Matteo
Calcedonio Di Pisa (1931–1962)
Francesco Domingo

E
Daniele Emmanuello (1963–2007)

F
Giuseppe Falsone
Giuseppe Farinella
Gaetano Fidanzati (1935–2013)

G
Giuseppe Giacomo Gambino (1941–1996)
John Gambino
Rosario Gambino
Carlo Gambino (1902–1976)
Raffaele Ganci
Giuseppe Genco Russo (1893–1976)
Nicola Gentile (1885–1976)
Nenè Geraci (1917–2007)
Antonino Giuffrè
Giuseppe Graviano
Giuseppe Greco (1952–1985)
Michele Greco (1924–2008)
Salvatore "The Engineer" Greco (1924–?)
Salvatore "Ciaschiteddu" Greco (1923–1978)
Giuseppe Guttadauro

I
Salvatore Inzerillo (1944–1981)

L
Angelo La Barbera (1924–1975)
Gioacchino La Barbera
Salvatore La Barbera (1922–1963)
Luciano Leggio (1925–1993)
Salvatore Lo Piccolo
Giuseppe Lucchese
Lucky Luciano (1897–1962)
Tommy Lucchese (1899–1967)

M
Francesco Madonia (1924–2007)
Stefano Magaddino (1891–1974)
Andrea Manciaracina
Vittorio Mangano (1940–2000)
Francesco Marino Mannoia
Cesare Manzella (1897–1963)
Salvatore Maranzano (1886–1931)
Filippo Marchese (1938–1983)
Giuseppe Marchese
Joe Masseria (1886–1931)
Leonardo Messina
Francesco Messina Denaro
Gerlandino Messina
Matteo Messina Denaro
Salvatore Miceli
Giuseppe Morello (1867–1930)
Giovanni Motisi
Gaspare Mutolo

N
Rosario Naimo
Michele Navarra (1905–1958)
Gianni Nicchi

P
Emilio Picariello (1875 or 1879–1923)
Angelo Antonino Pipitone
Mario Prestifilippo (1958–1987)
Bernardo Provenzano (1933–2016)
Vincenzo Puccio (1945–1989)
Gaspare Pulizzi
Luigi Putrone
Joe Profaci (1897–1962)

R
Domenico Raccuglia
Paolo Renda (1933–disappeared 2010)
Rosario Riccobono (1929–1982)
Salvatore Riina (1930–2017)
Nicolo Rizzuto (1924–2010)
Vito Rizzuto (1946–2013)
Antonio Rotolo

S
Antonio Salamone (1918–1998)
Antonio Salvo (1929–1986)
Ignazio Salvo (1932–1992)
Benedetto Santapaola
Gerlando Sciascia (1934–1999)
Vincenzo Sinagra
Santo Sorge (1908–1972)
Gaspare Spatuzza
Benedetto Spera
Frank Scalice (1893–1957)

T
Pietro Tagliavia
Pietro Torretta (1912–1975)
Mariano Tullio Troia (1933–2010)

V
Bernardino Verro (1866–1915)
Vincenzo Virga
Giusy Vitale
Leonardo Vitale (1941–1984)
Vito Vitale
Calogero Vizzini (1877–1954)

References

Padovani,Marcelle  & Giovanni Falcone (1992). Men of Honour: The Truth About the Mafia, HarperCollins, 

 
Sicilian mafiosi
 
Sicilian Mafia members
Sicilian Mafia members